NGC 3109 is a small barred Magellanic type spiral or irregular galaxy around 4.34 Mly away in the direction of the constellation of Hydra. NGC 3109 is believed to be tidally interacting with the dwarf elliptical galaxy Antlia Dwarf. It was discovered by John Herschel on March 24, 1835 while he was in what is now South Africa.

Size and morphology

NGC 3109 is classified as a Magellanic type irregular galaxy, but it may in fact be a small spiral galaxy. If it is a spiral galaxy, it would be the smallest in the Local Group. NGC 3109 has a mass of about 2.3×109 times the mass of the Sun, of which 20% is in the form of neutral hydrogen. It is oriented edge-on from our point of view, and may contain a disk and a halo. The disk appears to be composed of stars of all ages, whereas the halo contains only very old and metal-poor stars. NGC 3109 does not appear to possess a galactic nucleus.

From measurements of the neutral atomic hydrogen in the galaxy, it has been found that the disk of NGC 3109 is warped. The warp has the same radial velocity as gas in the Antlia Dwarf galaxy, indicating that the two galaxies had a close encounter approximately one billion years ago.

Composition

Based on spectroscopy of blue supergiants in NGC 3109, it is known that the galaxy has a low metallicity, similar to that to the Small Magellanic Cloud. It is one of the most metal-poor galaxies in the Local group.
NGC 3109 seems to contain an unusually large number of planetary nebulae for its luminosity. It also contains a substantial amount of dark matter.

Location

This puts it at the very outskirts of the Local Group. Its membership of the Local Group has been questioned, because it seems to be receding faster than estimates of the Local Group's escape velocity. It is distant enough from the largest members of the Local Group that it has not been tidally influenced by them.

NGC 3109 and ΛCDM
The high radial velocity of NGC 3109 for its position poses a severe challenge to the Lambda-CDM model of cosmology. It is too massive and distant from the Local Group for it to have been flung out in a three-body interaction involving the Milky Way or Andromeda Galaxy, unless more exotic scenarios like MOND are invoked.

Notes

References
Grebel, Gallagher, Harbeck (2003) The Progenitors of Dwarf Spheroidal Galaxies  ArXiv.org. retrieved November 2007

External links

 

Irregular galaxies
Barred spiral galaxies
NGC 3109 subgroup
Hydra (constellation)
3109
29128
Local Group
18350324
UGCA objects